The South American Youth Championship 1954 was held in Caracas, Venezuela. It was the first time the tournament was organised.

Teams
The following teams entered the tournament:

  Brazil
 
 
 
 
  Paraguay
 
 
  Venezuela (host)

Argentina did not participate in this tournament. They were the only non-European team to play in the 1954 FIFA Youth Tournament Under-18.

First round
Host Venezuela automatically qualified for the final round.

Group A

Group B

Second-place play-off

Final round

External links
Results by RSSSF

South American Youth Championship
1954 in youth association football